Marivivens niveibacter is a Gram-negative, aerobic and non-motile bacterium from the genus of Marivivens which has been isolated from seawater from a tropical mangrove forest.

References 

Rhodobacteraceae
Bacteria described in 2018